The Representation of the People (Scotland) Act 1868 (31 & 32 Vict c 48) was an Act of the Parliament of the United Kingdom. It carried on from the Representation of the People Act 1867, and created seven additional Scottish seats in the House of Commons at the expense of seven English borough constituencies, which were disenfranchised.

Two University constituencies were created; Edinburgh and St Andrews Universities and Glasgow and Aberdeen Universities. These each returned one member to Parliament. Two burgh constituencies received an additional member; these were Glasgow (raised to 3 members) and Dundee (raised to 2). A third burgh constituency, Hawick Burghs, was newly created, receiving one member. Three county constituencies each received one additional member, and were split in half accordingly; these were Lanarkshire, Ayrshire and Aberdeenshire.

This totalled eight new seats, and accordingly the county constituencies of Selkirkshire and Peeblesshire were merged to form Peebles and Selkirk, returning one member, for a net increase of seven seats.

This was offset by the disenfranchisement of Arundel, Ashburton, Dartmouth, Honiton, Lyme Regis, Thetford and Wells, all English borough constituencies, leaving the overall number of seats in the House unchanged.

See also 

 Reform Acts
 Representation of the People Act

Notes

References
Paterson (ed). The Practical Statutes of the Session 1868. Horace Cox. London. 1868. Page 135
Lawson, William. Notes of Decisions Under the Representation of the People Acts and the Registration Acts, 1885–1893, Inclusive. Alex Thom & Co. Dublin. Stevens and Sons. London. 1894. Pages 149 and 164.
"Registration Cases" (1868) 6 Scottish Law Reporter 28 to 53 and 98 to 107. See also other volumes of these reports.
(1908) 124 The Law Times 123
Moore's Almanack improved: or Will's farmer's and countryman's calendar for the year 1869

External links

1868 in British law
Acts of the Parliament of the United Kingdom concerning Scotland
United Kingdom Acts of Parliament 1868
Representation of the People Acts
1868 in Scotland